This was the first edition of the tournament.

Franco Agamenone won the title after defeating Sebastián Báez 7–5, 6–2 in the final.

Seeds

Draw

Finals

Top half

Bottom half

References

External links
Main draw
Qualifying draw

2021
Kyiv Open - 1